Nils Gustaf Weidel, né Johnsson (7 March 1890 – 11 December 1959) was a Swedish diplomat and gymnast who competed in the 1908 Summer Olympics.

Career
Gustaf Weidel was born as Gustaf Johnsson in Malmö, Sweden as the son of a local police chief inspector. As a youngster Weidel was a gymnast and was part of the Swedish team at the 1908 Summer Olympics in London, which was able to win the gold medal in the gymnastics men's team event. He was enrolled as a student at Lund University in 1909, becoming a Bachelor of Arts in 1910 and a Candidate of Law in 1914. It was during his time at the university that he changed his last name to Weidel.

In 1921 Weidel became employed by the Swedish Ministry for Foreign Affairs as an acting vice consul. He was commercial attaché and commercial counsellor in Washington, D.C., from 1922 to 1933. He was then consul general in New York City from 1933 to 1935 and Sweden's envoy in Rio de Janeiro from 1936 to 1943 and in Lisbon from 1943 to 1951. Weidel was envoy in Cairo, also accredited to Beirut and Damascus, from 1951 to 1955.

Personal life
Gustaf Weidel was from 1921 married to Louisa Pape. He died in Washington, D.C.

Awards and decorations
   Commander Grand Cross of the Order of the Polar Star (6 June 1955)
   Knight of the Order of Vasa
   Grand Cross of the Order of the Southern Cross
   Grand Cross of the Order of Christ
   Grand Cross of the Order of Merit of the Republic of Hungary

References

External links
Profile

1890 births
1959 deaths
Consuls-general of Sweden
Ambassadors of Sweden to Brazil
Ambassadors of Sweden to Portugal
Ambassadors of Sweden to Egypt
Ambassadors of Sweden to Lebanon
Ambassadors of Sweden to Syria
Swedish male artistic gymnasts
Gymnasts at the 1908 Summer Olympics
Olympic gymnasts of Sweden
Olympic gold medalists for Sweden
Olympic medalists in gymnastics
Medalists at the 1908 Summer Olympics
Swedish expatriates in the United States
Sportspeople from Malmö
Commanders First Class of the Order of the Polar Star
Knights of the Order of Vasa